Mathieu Fleury (born September 26, 1985 in Ottawa, Ontario) is the former Ottawa City Councillor of Rideau-Vanier Ward, which includes Lowertown, Sandy Hill and Vanier. He won the ward in the 2010 Ottawa municipal election, defeating the incumbent Georges Bédard in a narrow contest, the youngest City Councillor to be elected at that time. He was subsequently re-elected as the councillor in the 2014 and 2018 Ottawa municipal elections. He indicated in early 2022 that he would not seek re-election in the 2022 municipal elections.  He was the recipient of the 2022 Bernard Grandmaitre award from ACFO Ottawa.

Early life
Fleury was born in Ottawa and raised in Sandy Hill and Lowertown neighbourhoods. He attended Francojeunesse and Franco-Cité School in Ottawa, and later attended the University of Ottawa.

Municipal Politics

Fleury was the chair of the Ottawa Community Housing Board, the Ottawa Sports Commissioner, a member of the city of Ottawa's Transportation Committee and the Community and Protective Services Committee. During his career, Fleury lobbied for infrastructure improvements, including the Adawe Bridge, the reconstruction of Sussex Drive, Rideau Street Reconstruction and Montreal Road development. He supported the city of Ottawa's move to become a bilingual city. Fleury has also lobbied for the increasing of "safe supply" of narcotics, which he claims to prevent overdosing and drug-associated crime.

Personal life
Fleury is married to his wife Lai.

Fleury has made political donations to several Liberal politicians in the past, including Madeleine Meilleur, Mona Fortier and Nathalie Des Rosiers.

References

External links
Biography

Franco-Ontarian people
Living people
Ottawa city councillors
1985 births
University of Ottawa alumni